Lake Paul is a community in the Canadian province of Nova Scotia, located in  Kings County.  It is located to the east of the lake known by the same name.

It has a population of approximately 100 people.

References
 Lake Paul on Destination Nova Scotia

Communities in Kings County, Nova Scotia